The facial vein (or anterior facial vein) is a relatively large vein in the human face. It commences at the side of the root of the nose and is a direct continuation of the angular vein where it also receives a small nasal branch. It lies behind the facial artery and follows a less tortuous course.  It receives blood from the external palatine vein before it either joins the anterior branch of the retromandibular vein to form the common facial vein, or drains directly into the internal jugular vein.

A common misconception states that the facial vein has no valves, but this has been contradicted by recent studies.

Its walls are not so flaccid as most superficial veins.

Path
From its origin it runs obliquely downward and backward, beneath the zygomaticus major muscle and zygomatic head of the quadratus labii superioris, descends along the anterior border and then on the superficial surface of the masseter, crosses over the body of the mandible, and passes obliquely backward, beneath the platysma and cervical fascia, superficial to the submandibular gland, the digastricus and stylohyoideus muscles.

Clinical significance
Thrombophlebitis of the facial vein, (inflammation of the facial vein with secondary clot formation) can result in pieces of an infected clot extending into the cavernous sinus, forming thrombophlebitis of the cavernous sinus. Infections may spread from the facial veins into the dural venous sinuses. Infections may also be introduced by facial lacerations and by bursting pimples in the areas drained by the facial vein.

Additional images

References

External links
 
 Figure 47-5 

Veins of the head and neck
Vein